Elior Evangelical University (EEU) is a university  in Port-au-Prince, Haiti, reaching other cities of Haiti, French-speaking regions of the Caribbean and  in the United States of America. It offers undergraduate to postgraduate programs online, remotely and on campus in Port-au-Prince.

History 

In 2015, Dr Desir Cedric founded the university with various Haitian and African theologians, sociologists, anthropologists and entrepreneurs. The university created a Faculty of Theological and Religious Sciences and one of Health Sciences working with more than 176 Partner institutions in 84 Countries. 

From 2016, after a crisis within the company, Cedric died from blood cancer on November 8, 2016.  Professor Desir Michael C.O Jonathan took over by working with university ambassadors in Florida and Quebec. The Department of Postgraduate Studies deals with Master's and Doctorate programs, while integrating:

 Faculty of Education Sciences

 Faculty of Administrative Sciences

 Faculty of Agronomic Sciences

 Faculty of Development Sciences

 Entrepreneurship

References

External links 

 www.elioreuniversityedu.us

Universities in Haiti
Haiti articles needing attention